Darcy Tucker (born 23 January 1997) is an Australian rules footballer who plays for the North Melbourne Football Club in the Australian Football League (AFL), after previously playing for the Fremantle Football Club.

Early career

Originally from Horsham, Victoria, he played for the North Ballarat Rebels in the TAC Cup Under 18s competition and also for the Horsham Saints Football Club in the Wimmera Football League. He was recruited to Fremantle with their first selection, 27th overall, in the 2015 AFL draft.

AFL career

He made his AFL debut in Round 5 of the 2016 AFL season, against Carlton at Domain Stadium, after playing well for Fremantle's reserves team, Peel Thunder, in the West Australian Football League (WAFL). Round 7 of the 2022 AFL season saw Tucker play his 100th game during Fremantle's 3 point win over Geelong at GMHBA Stadium. Tucker was traded to  following the 2022 AFL season.

Statistics
 Statistics are correct to the end of round 10, 2022

|- style="background-color: #EAEAEA"
! scope="row" style="text-align:center" | 2016
|style="text-align:center;"|
| 18 || 12 || 3 || 4 || 100 || 77 || 177 || 37 || 48 || 0.2 || 0.3 || 8.3 || 6.4 || 14.8 || 3.1 || 4.0 || 0
|-
| scope="row" text-align:center| 2017
|style="text-align:center;"|
| 18 || 19 || 8 || 4 || 154 || 135 || 289 || 75 || 45 || 0.4 || 0.2 || 8.1 || 7.1 || 15.2 || 3.9 || 2.4 || 0
|- style="background-color: #EAEAEA"
! scope="row" style="text-align:center" | 2018
|style="text-align:center;"|
| 18 || 17 || 8 || 6 || 124 || 119 || 243 || 52 || 55 || 0.5 || 0.4 || 7.3 || 7.0 || 14.3 || 3.1 || 3.2 || 0
|-
| scope="row" text-align:center| 2019
|style="text-align:center;"|
| 18 || 22 || 10 || 7 || 199 || 221 || 420 || 73 || 81 || 0.5 || 0.3 || 9.0 || 10.0 || 19.1 || 3.3 || 3.7 || 0
|- style="background-color: #EAEAEA"
! scope="row" style="text-align:center" | 2020
|style="text-align:center;"|
| 18 || 8 || 4 || 2 || 68 || 44 || 112 || 21 || 26 || 0.5 || 0.3 || 8.5 || 5.5 || 14.0 || 2.6 || 3.3 || 2
|-
| scope="row" text-align:center| 2021
|style="text-align:center;"|
| 18 || 16 || 0 || 2 || 152 || 120 || 272 || 64 || 29 || 0.0 || 0.1 || 9.5 || 7.5 || 17.0 || 4.0 || 1.8 || 0
|- style="background-color: #EAEAEA"
! scope="row" style="text-align:center" | 2022
|style="text-align:center;"|
| 18 || 8 || 2 || 1 || 57 || 42 || 99 || 32 || 11 || 0.3 || 0.1 || 7.1 || 5.3 || 12.4 || 4.0 || 1.4 || TBA
|- class="sortbottom"
! colspan=3| Career
! 102
! 35
! 26
! 854
! 758
! 1612
! 354
! 295
! 0.3
! 0.3
! 8.4
! 7.4
! 15.8
! 3.5
! 2.9
! 2
|}

Notes

References

External links

1997 births
Living people
Fremantle Football Club players
Horsham Saints Football Club players
Peel Thunder Football Club players
Greater Western Victoria Rebels players
Australian rules footballers from Victoria (Australia)
North Ballarat Football Club players